Many significant companies are based in Nashville, Tennessee, and its surrounding communities in the Nashville metropolitan area. Five of the companies, HCA Healthcare, Dollar General, Community Health Systems, Delek US Holdings, and Tractor Supply, were members of the Fortune 500 in 2020, ranking 65th, 112th, 241st, 342nd, and 380th respectively.

Companies in Nashville

 247Sports
 Abingdon Press
 AllianceBernstein
 Advocat Inc.
 American Economic Association
 Arrangers' Publishing Company
 Asurion
 AMG/Parade
 Back Yard Burgers
 Baldwin Piano Company
 BillFixers
 Biscuit Love
 Bridgestone Americas Holding (Bridgestone-Firestone)
 Broken Bow Records
 Captain D's
 Caterpillar Financial Services Corporation (finance arm of Caterpillar Inc.)
 Central Parking Corporation
 Cokesbury
 Country Music Television
 Credential Recordings
 Curb Records
 Firestone Tire and Rubber Company
 The General
 Genesco
 Gibson Guitar Corporation
 Great American Country
 Gruhn Guitars
 Hankook Tire America
 Harrow Health
 Hattie B's Hot Chicken
 HCA Holdings, Inc.
 Hospital Corporation of America
 iHeart Media
 Informatics Corporation of America
 Ingram Barge Company
 Ingram Industries
 Innovative Hearth Products
 J. Alexander's
 Jerry Jones Guitars
 Lifepoint Hospitals
 LifeWay Christian Resources
 Logan's Roadhouse
 Louisiana-Pacific
 Nashville Brewing Company
 O'Charley's
 Oreck Corporation
 Pinnacle Financial
 Purity Dairies
 Randall House Publications
 Ryman Hospitality Properties
 SESAC
 Shoney's
 Silicon Ranch
 SmileDirectClub
 Sony Music Nashville
 SMS Holdings
 Southwestern family of companies
 Stoney River
 Sun Records
 Thomas Nelson Publishing
 Total Nonstop Action Wrestling
 Universal Lighting Technologies
 Universal Logic
 Universal Music Group Nashville
 Vanderbilt University & Medical Center
 Vanguard Health Systems
 Word Records
 Yazoo Brewing Company

Companies in the metro area

 Brookdale Senior Living in Brentwood
 CKE Restaurants in Franklin
 Community Health Systems in Franklin
 Contour Airlines in Smyrna
 CoreCivic in Brentwood
 Cracker Barrel in Lebanon
 Delek US Holdings in Brentwood
 Dollar General in Goodlettsville
 Healthways in Franklin
 Hobby Express in Franklin
 Iasis Healthcare in Franklin
 The ICEE Company
 Ingram Content Group in La Vergne
 Kaiser Aluminum
 Kirkland's in Brentwood
 Mars Petcare in Franklin
 Mitsubishi Motors in Franklin
 MyOutdoorTV.com in Franklin
 Nissan North America in Franklin
 OHL in Brentwood
 Old Time Pottery in Murfreesboro
 Servpro Industries in Gallatin
 Singer Corporation in La Vergne
 Surgery Partners in Brentwood
 Tractor Supply Company in Brentwood
 Triangle Group in Franklin

Companies with a strong presence

 Altegrity
 Amazon
 American Society of Composers, Authors and Publishers
 AT&T
 Bank of America
 Broadcast Music, Inc.
 Dell
 Deloitte
 Fifth Third Bank
 First Tennessee
 GEODIS
 Lyft
 Oracle
 Pilot.com
 Randstad
 Regions Financial Corporation
 Schneider Electric
 Sony
 State Farm Insurance
 SunTrust
 The Kroger Company
 U.S. Bank
 UBS Business Solutions
 Verizon Wireless

References

Nashville
Nashville, Tennessee-related lists